Balmforth is a surname of English origin, being a variant of the surname Bamford. Notable people with the surname include:

Anthony Balmforth (1926-2009), British archdeacon
Darren Balmforth (born 1972), Australian former lightweight rower
Denive Balmforth (born 2003), English professional rugby league footballer

See also
Bamford (surname)
Balmford